En Vivo: Desde Mexico is the first live album (third overall) of the Chilean/Ecuatorian pop/rock group Kudai. It was released on October 2, 2007.

Track listing
 "Intro"
 "No Quiero Regresar"
 "Vuelo"
 "Tal Vez"
 "Okay"
 "Lejos De La Ciudad"
 "Tú"
 "Ya Nada Queda"
 "Quiero Mis Quinces"
 "Llévame"
 "Escapar"
 "Sin Despertar"
 "Déjame Gritar"

References

Kudai albums
2007 live albums